Subhash may refer to:

People
 Subhash Agarwal, Indian professional player and coach of English billiards and snooker
 Subhash Awchat (born 1960), Indian artist and author based in Mumbai
 Subhash Bapurao Wankhede (born 1963), Indian politician and a member of the Shiv Sena (SS) political party. He is a member of the 15th Lok Sabha of India and represents the Hingoli constituency in Maharashtra state
 Subhash Bhaskar Nair (1964–2004), was a gangster and hitman, who was shot dead by the Gujarat police during an encounter in Valsad in June 2004
 Subhas Chandra Bose (1897–1945), one of the most prominent Indian nationalist leaders who attempted to liberate India from British rule during the waning years of World War II
 Subhas Chakraborty (1942–2009), popular leader in the Communist Party of India (Marxist) and Transport, Sports and Youth Services Minister in the Government of West Bengal
 Subhas Sumbhu Chakrobarty (born 1985), Indian football player. He is currently playing for United Sports Club in the I-League in India as a Midfielder
 Subhas Anandan (1947–2015), prominent criminal lawyer in Singapore
 Subhas Bhowmick
 Subhas Brigade, a unit of the Indian National Army (INA)
 Subhas Ghising
 Subhash Mukhopadhyay (poet) (1919–2003), Indian Bengali poet
 Subhash Mukhopadhyay (physician) (1931–1981), Indian gynecologist
 Subhash Agarwal, Indian professional player and coach of English billiards and snooker
 Subhash Awchat (born 1960), Indian artist and author based in Mumbai
 Subhash Bhatt (born 1945), Indian cricketer who played for Gujarat. He was born in Ahmedabad
 Subhash Bhende (died 2010), Marathi writer from Goa, India. He died in December, 2010
 Subhash Bhowmick, nicknamed Bhombal, born at West Bengal is a retired Indian football international player and club level coach and manager
 Subhash Chandra (born 1950), onetime rice exporter-turned media baron and Chairman of Essel Group, that launched India's satellite television revolution
 Subhash Chandran (born 1972), Malayalam author who has won the Confederation of Tamil Nadu Malayali Associations (CTMA) literary prize for outstanding young writers
 Subhash Sureshchandra Deshmukh (born 1957), member of the 14th Lok Sabha of India. He represents the solapur constituency of Maharashtra and is a member of the Bharatiya Janata Party
 Subhash Ghai (born 1945), Indian film director, producer and screenwriter
 Subhash Ghisingh (born 1936), leader of Gorkhaland National Liberation Front (GNLF) which he founded in 1980. He was the chairman of the Darjeeling Gorkha Hill Council in West Bengal, India from 1988 to 2008. He spearheaded the Gorkhaland movement in the 1980s
 Subhash Gupte (1929–2002),  pronunciation (help·info) (11 December 1929 in Bombay, India – 31 May 2002, Port of Spain, Trinidad and Tobago) was one of Test cricket's finest spin bowlers
 Subhash Kak (born 1947), Indian American computer scientist, most notable for his controversial Indological publications on history, the philosophy of science, ancient astronomy, and the history of mathematics
 Subhash Khot, Associate Professor at New York University. He is best known for his Unique games conjecture
 Subhash Maharia (born 1957), former union minister of state, rural development in Government of India. He was minister from 1999 to 2004. He is a leader of Bharatiya Janta Party and was a member of 12th, 13th and 14th Lok Sabha from Sikar in Rajasthan
 Subhash Misra, poet, development worker and UNICEF staff
 Subhash Modi (born 1946), Kenyan umpire. Modi has served as the Kenya Cricket Umpires and Scorers Association as chairman, secretary and treasurer, the organisation awarded him life membership for his services. He also played for Kenya in 1969
 Subhash Bhaskar Nair (1964–2004), was a gangster and hitman, who was shot dead by the Gujarat police during an encounter in Valsad in June 2004
 Subhash Saini, senior computer scientist at NASA Ames Research Center
 Subhash Sharma, freelance photographer based in Mumbai, India, who specializes in humanistic and documentary photography
 Subhash C Kashyap (born 1929), born 10 May 1929) is a former Secretary-General of 7th Lok Sabha, 8th Lok Sabha and 9th Lok Sabha and Lok Sabha Secretariat (Lower House of Parliament of India) from 1984 to 1990
 Subhash Suri (born 1960), Indian-American computer scientist, a professor at the University of California, Santa Barbara. He is known for his research in computational geometry, computer networks, and algorithmic game theory
 Subhash Prasad Yadav, politician of the Rashtriya Janata Dal party and is presently a Member of the Parliament of India representing Bihar in the Rajya Sabha, the upper house of the Indian Parliament
 Subhash Zanak, present MLA from Risod Constituency and Ex-Cabinet Minister of Women and Child Development in the Government of Maharashtra in India
 Subhash Singh (born 1990), Indian football player
 Subhash Dutta (1930–2012), Bangladeshi filmmaker
 Subhash Kapoor, Indian film director, producer and screenwriter
 Subhash Bhojwani, a retired Indian Air Force Air Marshal
 Subhas Mungra, a Surinamese diplomat and former Foreign Minister

Places 
 Subhash Bridge
 Subhash vihar